Movin' Right Along is an album by saxophonist Arnett Cobb recorded in 1960 for the Prestige label.

Reception
The Allmusic review awarded the album 4 stars and stated: "Movin' Right Along is a warm, stimulating set. Recorded in two days in February 1960, the album finds Arnett Cobb and a few friends playing an energetic, straight-ahead set".

Track listing 
All compositions by Arnett Cobb except as indicated
 "Nitty Gritty" - 3:54  
 "All I Do Is Dream of You" (Nacio Herb Brown, Arthur Freed) - 4:03  
 "I Don't Stand a Ghost of a Chance With You" (Bing Crosby, Ned Washington, Victor Young) - 5:23  
 "Exactly Like You" (Dorothy Fields, Jimmy McHugh) - 6:31  
 "Walkin'" (Richard Carpenter) - 5:29  
 "Softly, As in a Morning Sunrise" (Oscar Hammerstein II, Sigmund Romberg) - 4:08  
 "Fast Ride" - 4:12  
 "The Shy One" - 4:43  
Recorded at Van Gelder Studio in Englewood Cliffs, New Jersey, on February 16 (track 7) and February 17 (tracks 1-6 & 8), 1960.

Personnel 
 Arnett Cobb - tenor saxophone
 Tommy Flanagan (track 7), Bobby Timmons (tracks 1-6 & 8) - piano
 Sam Jones - bass
 Art Taylor - drums
 Danny Barrajanos (track 7), Buck Clarke (tracks 1-6 & 8) - congas

References 

Arnett Cobb albums
1960 albums
Albums produced by Esmond Edwards
Albums recorded at Van Gelder Studio
Prestige Records albums